Hynčice is a Silesian village, administratively part of Vražné municipality, located about 13 km west of Nový Jičín in Moravian-Silesian Region, Czech Republic. According to 2001 census it had 58 houses and population of 232.

The village is best known for being the birthplace of Gregor Mendel; at the time it was known as Heinzendorf bei Odrau.

References

External links
 Vražné at bohemianet

Villages in Nový Jičín District